The 1986 Cork Intermediate Football Championship was the 51st staging of the Cork Intermediate Football Championship since its establishment by the Cork County Board in 1909. The draw for the opening round fixtures took place on 26 January 1986. The championship ran from 27 April to 17 August 1986.

The final was played on 15 September 1985 at Páirc Uí Chaoimh in Cork, between O'Donovan Rossa and Glanmire, in what was their first ever meeting in the final. O'Donovan Rossa won the match by 3-11 to 0-08 to claim their second championship title overall and a first title in 61 years.

Kilshannig's William O'Riordan was the championship's top scorer with 3-10.

Results

First round

 Ballincollig received a bye in this round.

Quarter-finals

Semi-finals

Final

Championship statistics

Top scorers

Overall

In a single game

References

Cork Intermediate Football Championship